Rokytovce is a village and municipality in the Medzilaborce District in the Prešov Region of far north-eastern Slovakia.

History
In historical records the village was first mentioned in 1437.

Geography
The municipality lies at an altitude of 350 metres and covers an area of 7.379 km². It has a population of about 185 people.

References

External links
 
 
http://www.statistics.sk/mosmis/eng/run.html

Villages and municipalities in Medzilaborce District